Events from the year 1832 in art.

Events
 New Society of Painters in Water Colours holds its first exhibition, in London.

Awards
 Prix de Rome
 for painting – Antoine Wiertz
 for sculpture – François Jouffroy

Works

 William Etty
 The Destroying Angel and Daemons of Evil Interrupting the Orgies of the Vicious and Intemperate
 Youth on the Prow, and Pleasure at the Helm
 Hokusai – The Great Wave off Kanagawa
 Jean Auguste Dominique Ingres – Portrait of Monsieur Bertin
 Henry Inman - "Pes-Ke-Le-Cha-Co"
 James Arthur O'Connor – A Thunderstorm: The Frightened Wagoner
 Joseph Paelinck – Juno
 Richard Westmacott - Statue of George Canning, Parliament Square

Births
 January 6 – Gustave Doré, French illustrator (died 1883)
 January 23 – Édouard Manet, French painter, (died 1883)
 January 27 – Arthur Hughes, English Pre-Raphaelite painter (died 1915)
 February 21 – Louis Maurer, German American lithographer (died 1932 age 100)
 March 4 – Samuel Colman, American Hudson River school painter (died 1920)
 May 12 – Carl von Perbandt, German landscape painter (died 1911) 
 June 1 – Henrietta Ward, English painter (died 1924)
 July 3 – Louis-Charles Verwee, Belgian painter (died 1882)
 July 27 – Đura Jakšić, Serbian painter and poet (died 1878)
 November 15 – Hermann Ottomar Herzog, German American landscape painter (died 1932)
 December 12 – Mauritz de Haas, Dutch American marine painter (died 1895)
 George Anderson Lawson, Scottish-born sculptor (died 1904)
 Approximate date – Emma Brownlow, English genre painter (died 1905)

Deaths
 February 2 – Amos Doolittle, American engraver (born 1752)
 February 22
Christina Charlotta Cederström, Swedish artist, poet, and baroness (born 1760)
Asensio Juliá, Spanish painter and engraver (born 1760)
 March 13 – Aleksander Orłowski, Polish painter and sketch maker, pioneer of lithography in the Russian Empire (born 1777)
 March 22 – Johann Wolfgang von Goethe, German writer and art critic (born 1749)
 March 30 – Dora Stock, German portrait painter (born 1760)
 March 31 – Antoni Brodowski, Polish Neo-classicist painter and pedagogue (born 1784)
 April 13
 Jean-Baptiste Jacques Augustin, French miniature painter (born 1759)
 Joseph Barney, English painter (born 1753)
 April 22 – Guillaume Guillon-Lethière, French neoclassical painter (born 1760)
 April 23 – François-Nicolas Delaistre, French sculptor (born 1746)
 May 7 – Charles Guillaume Alexandre Bourgeois, French physicist and painter (born 1759)
 June 24 – Nicolas-Marie Gatteaux, French medal engraver (born 1751)
 August 17 – James Bisset, Scottish-born artist, manufacturer, writer, collector, art dealer and poet (born 1762)
 September 22
Philibert-Louis Debucourt, French painter and engraver (born 1755)
William Fowler, English artist (born 1761)
 October 14 – Johann Heinrich Meyer, Swiss painter and art writer (born 1760)
 date unknown:
 Edme Bovinet, French engraver (born 1767)
 John Comerford, Irish miniature painter (born 1773)
 Augustin Félix Fortin, French painter of landscapes, and of genre and historical subjects (born 1763)
 Robert Havell, Sr., English engraver and publisher (born 1769)
 Anna Rajecka, Polish painter and drawing artist (born 1762)

References 

 
Years of the 19th century in art
1830s in art